The Koplik War (Albanian: Lufta e Koplikut) was a series of battles that occurred between Albania and the Kingdom of Serbs, Croats and Slovenes in 1920 and 1921.

Background 
After the retreat of Austria-Hungary on October 31, 1918, Shkodra was controlled by the military force of the victorious Allies of the First World War, commanded by the French general De Fortou. After the statement of the American president Woodrow Wilson for not leaving aside the issue of Albania's borders, the statement also stated that no territorial compensation would be accepted in Northern Albania in favor of the Yugoslavia. At the request of the government that emerged from the Lushnja Congress, on March 11, 1920, the French general left Shkodra under the management of the perlimitar and its chairman, Musa Juka.

War 
In July 1920 the Yugoslav Forces started their invasion in Koplik. Then they invaded the tribal regions of Kelmendi, Kastrati, Shkreli and Koplik. Facing the resistance of the Albanian forces, the Yugoslav forces were forced to withdraw back to Montenegro. 

Yugoslav forces launched a new offensive on August and occupied  Kelmendi, Kastrati, Shkreli and Koplik. To face the Yugoslav aggression, over 3000 Albanian fighters from Shkodra and other districts lined up in front. A 400-strong volunteer force stood on the banks of the Buna in anticipation of a Yugoslav attack in this direction. In the face of the determined resistance of the Albanian forces and isolated in the international arena, the Yugoslav government was forced to remove its troops from the Shkodra Highlands and evacuate Kastrati on 14 February 1921, leaving behind burned villages.

Aftermath 
Shortly after the War, the Kingdom of Yugoslavia supported the establishment of the Republic of Mirdita in its efforts to push for more advantageous border demarcation for Yugoslavia. Thus in July 1921 the Kingdom of Yugoslavia again invaded Albania and its forces became engaged, after clashes with Albanian tribesmen, in the northern part of the country. The League of Nations intervened and sent a commission of representatives from various powers in the region. In November 1921, the League decided that the frontiers of Albania should be the same as they had been in 1913, although the United Kingdom insisted on slight adaptations in the region of Debar, Prizren and Kastrati in the interest of Yugoslavia. Yugoslav forces withdrew and the Republic of Mirdita was extinguished by Albanian forces. In an effort to gain the favor of the Border Demarcation Commission the two countries established formal diplomatic relations in March 1922.

References 

Military history of Albania
Military history of Yugoslavia
Malësi e Madhe
1920 in military history
1921 in military history